Harvey Wesley Hardy (October 29, 1825 – January 10, 1913) was an American politician who served as the mayor of Lincoln, Nebraska.

Life

Harvey Wesley Hardy was born on October 29, 1825, to Samuel Hardy and Polly Parker in Perry, New York and his family moved to Gainesville, New York in 1830. Hardy attended public schools until he was seventeen, then attended Wesleyan Seminary, and graduated from Genesee Community College. Afterwards, he became superintendent of schools in Gainesville and then Wyoming county superintendent. On June 6, 1855, he married Charlotte Abbott and would later have four children with her. In 1868, he moved to Aurora, Illinois and then moved to Lincoln, Nebraska in 1870, where he operated furniture businesses in both places.

Hardy joined the Whig Party and later joined the Republican Party shortly after it was founded. In 1877, he was elected as mayor of Lincoln, Nebraska and then again in 1878, and during his tenure he created a $1,000 liquor license fee. During the 1884 presidential election, he joined the Prohibition Party and supported former Kansas Governor John St. John. In 1884, he ran for the Nebraska State Senate and for governor in 1886 with the Prohibition nominations. During the 1896 presidential election he supported William Jennings Bryan. 

Hardy died in Lincoln, Nebraska on January 10, 1913.

Electoral history

References

1825 births
1913 deaths
19th-century American politicians
American temperance activists
Mayors of Lincoln, Nebraska
Nebraska Prohibitionists
Nebraska Republicans
New York (state) Republicans
Politicians from Lincoln, Nebraska
People from Perry, New York